The Fike Model E was a light aircraft built in the United States in the early 1970s. Designed by airline pilot William Fike, it was a conventional high-wing cantilever monoplane with tailskid undercarriage and seating for one or two people in an enclosed cabin. The wing was an unusual geodesic wooden construction and was of far greater chord than typical for an aircraft of this type; indeed, one of the purposes of building the aircraft was to investigate the characteristics of a wing of such low aspect ratio (3.0). The empennage was taken from a Piper Cub, but was modified to reduce its span to make it suitable for towing on the road. Plans were made available for homebuilders in the mid 1970s.

Specifications

References

 
 

1970s United States sport aircraft
Homebuilt aircraft
High-wing aircraft
Single-engined tractor aircraft
E
Aircraft first flown in 1970